Asystel Novara was a name used by two different women volleyball clubs based in Novara, Italy. It may refer to:

AGIL Volley, played as Asystel Novara from 2001 until 2003
Asystel Volley, played as Asystel Novara from 2003 until 2012